Pukenui School may refer to:
Pukenui School in Pukenui, Northland Region
Pukenui School in Te Kuiti, Waikato Region